Tuppurainen is a Finnish surname.

Notable people

Allu Tuppurainen (born 1951), Finnish actor and screenwriter
Jani Tuppurainen (born 1980), Finnish ice hockey player
Kalle Tuppurainen (1904–1954), Finnish skier
Timo Tuppurainen (1973-), Finnish musician
Ville Tuppurainen (born 1988), Finnish Nordic combined skier

References

Finnish-language surnames